In surface science, the du Noüy ring method is a technique for measuring the surface tension of a liquid. The method involves slowly lifting a ring, often made of platinum, from the surface of a liquid.  The force, required to raise the ring from the liquid's surface is measured and related to the liquid's surface tension, :

When the ring's thickness is much smaller than its diameter, this equation can be simplified to:

where  is the average of the inner and outer radius of the ring, i.e. 

This technique was proposed by the French physicist Pierre Lecomte du Noüy (1883–1947) in a paper published in 1925.

The measurement is performed with a force tensiometer, which typically uses an electrobalance to measure the excess force caused by the liquid being pulled up and automatically calculates and displays the surface tension corresponding to the force. Earlier, torsion wire balances were commonly used. The maximum force is used for the calculations, and empirically determined correction factors are required to remove the effect caused by the finite diameter of the ring:

with  being the correction factor.

The most common correction factors include those by Zuidema and Waters (for liquids with low interfacial tension), Huh and Mason (which covers a wider range than Zuidema-Waters), and Harkins and Jordan (more precise than Huh-Mason while still covering the most widely used liquids).

The surface tension and correction factors are expressed by the following equations:

 Zuidema and Waters: 
 = maximum pull of rings [dyn/cm]
 = density of the lower and upper phases

 [s2.cm−1]
 = Du Noüy wire radius
 = Du Noüy ring radius

See also 

 Sessile drop technique
 Wilhelmy plate

References

External links 

 Video showing a classical torsion wire du Noüy tensiometer
 Picture of a classical torsion wire du Noüy tensiometer (National Institutes of Health)

Scientific techniques